Pozza di Fassa (Ladin: Poza (de Fascia)) is a frazione of Sèn Jan di Fassa in Trentino in the northern Italian region Trentino-Alto Adige/Südtirol, located about  northeast of Trento.

The frazione of Pozza di Fassa contains the frazioni (subdivisions, mainly villages and hamlets) Pera di Fassa and Monzon.

Pozza di Fassa borders the following municipalities: Canazei, Tiers, Mazzin, Welschnofen, Rocca Pietore, Vigo di Fassa, Moena and Soraga.

In the census of 2001, 1,587 inhabitants out of 1,787 (88.8%) declared Ladin as their native language.

Demographic evolution

Gallery

References

Cities and towns in Trentino-Alto Adige/Südtirol